This is a list of fried dough foods. Many cultures have dishes that are prepared by deep frying dough in many various forms. Doughnuts are a type of fried dough food that are covered separately in the Wikipedia article List of doughnut varieties.

Fried dough foods

See also

 Fried bread
 Fried dough
 List of deep fried foods
 List of desserts
 List of doughnut varieties
 List of pastries

References

Further reading
Rosana G Moriera et al., Deep Fat Frying: Fundamentals and Applications.

External links

 Ethnic fried doughs around the world (archived)

 
Fried dough
Dough, fried